Joseph Leonard Carrigg (February 23, 1901 – February 6, 1989) was a Republican member of the U.S. House of Representatives from Pennsylvania.

Joseph L. Carrigg was born in Susquehanna, Pennsylvania; three of his grandparents were Irish immigrants.  He graduated from Niagara University in Niagara Falls, New York in 1922, Albany Law School in Albany, New York in 1924, and Dickinson School of Law in Carlisle, Pennsylvania, in 1925.  Carrigg was a member of Phi Sigma Kappa fraternity while at Albany. He was district attorney of Susquehanna County, Pennsylvania, from 1936 to 1948, and burgess of the borough of Susquehanna from 1948 to 1951.

Carrigg was elected as a Republican to the 82nd Congress to fill the vacancy caused by the death of Wilson D. Gillette.  He was reelected to the Eighty-third, Eighty-fourth, and Eighty-fifth Congresses. Carrigg voted in favor of the Civil Rights Act of 1957. He was an unsuccessful candidate for reelection in 1958, defeated by Democrat Stanley A. Prokop.  After his time in Congress, he served as the Director of Practice for the Internal Revenue Service in Washington, D.C., from 1959 to 1960.  He also worked as secretary to Representative William Scranton of Pennsylvania in 1961.  He served as manager of the State Workmen's Insurance Fund of Pennsylvania from 1963 through 1971.

Sources

Joseph L. Carrigg at The Political Graveyard

References

1901 births
1989 deaths
American people of Irish descent
People from Susquehanna County, Pennsylvania
Niagara University alumni
Albany Law School alumni
County district attorneys in Pennsylvania
Internal Revenue Service people
Republican Party members of the United States House of Representatives from Pennsylvania
20th-century American lawyers
20th-century American politicians